The Regina Rifles are a Junior B box lacrosse team based in Regina, Saskatchewan, playing in the top league in Saskatchewan, the Prairie Gold Lacrosse League. The expansion team entered the Saskatchewan Major Box Lacrosse League (later became PGLL) in 2010.

History
The Rifles joined the Regina Riot as the second Junior B team from Regina. The Rifles are operated and managed by the Queen City Minor Box Lacrosse Association in Regina. Their home arena is the Co-Operators Centre.

The Rifles won their first-ever game in the Prairie Gold Lacrosse League, 11-5 over the Assiniboia Attack. The first goal scored by a Rifles player was in exhibition play by Brett Kealey. The first hat trick by a Rifle player was scored by Taylor Frei, who went on to win the team goal-scoring title and the PGLL league goal scoring title during the Rifles inaugural season. The Rifles surprised the league by finishing with a .500 season and tied for fifth overall in the standings.

Season-by-season

References

External links 
 Regina Rifles

Lacrosse teams in Saskatchewan
Sport in Regina, Saskatchewan
Lacrosse clubs established in 2010
2010 establishments in Saskatchewan